Super Flight is the second studio album by Japanese jazz fusion band Casiopea, released via Alfa Records on November 25, 1979. Recording took place at Studio A in Shibaura, Tokyo from August to October of that year. The album cover arts depicts a blimp with "Casiopea" written on the side flying during a sunset near Lower Manhattan, New York.

Track listing

Credits and personnel
Recorded and mixed at Studio "A", Shibaura, Tokyo, August 27 – October 13, 1979

Musicians
Issei Noro – electric guitar, fretless guitar, arrangements
Minoru Mukaiya – keyboard, organ, pedal bass, synthesizers, vocoder on "I Love New York", "Flying" and "Magic Ray", string arrangement on "Take Me"
Tetsuo Sakurai – bass guitar, fretless bass
Takashi Sasaki – drums
Kanya Kazama – backup drums
Penny (Toshitaro & Riverside) – percussion
Debrah Correll – vocals (B3)

Jun Fukamachi – conductor, horn arrangement on "Mighty Mouse"
Koji Hatori – trumpet
Toshio Araki – trumpet
Eiji Arai – trombone
Jake H. Conception – alto saxophone
Takeru Maruaoka – tenor saxophone
Shunzo Sunahara – baritone saxophone
Tomato Strings – strings

Production and design

Kunihiko Murai – executive producer
Syoro Kawazoe – executive producer
Shunsuke Miyazumi – producer
Shinji Sawada – producer
Norio Yoshizawa – recording, mixing engineer

Yasuhiko Terada – assistant engineer
Alphabet – art direction, design
Toshikuni Okubo – illustrator
Jun Takemura – liner notes
Kouji Suzuki – remastering engineer (2016)

Release history

External links

References

1979 albums
Casiopea albums
Alfa Records albums